The middle cerebral veins - the superficial middle cerebral vein and the deep middle cerebral vein - are two veins running along the lateral sulcus. The superficial middle cerebral vein is also known as the superficial Sylvian vein, and the deep middle cerebral vein is also known as the deep Sylvian vein. The lateral sulcus is also known as the Sylvian fissure.

Superficial middle cerebral vein 
The superficial middle cerebral vein (superficial Sylvian vein) begins on the lateral surface of the hemisphere. It runs along the lateral sulcus to empty into either the cavernous sinus, or sphenoparietal sinus. It is adherent to the deep surface of the arachnoid mater bridging the lateral sulcus. It drains the adjacent cortex.

Anastomoses 
At its posterior extremity, the superficial middle cerebral vein is connected with the superior sagittal sinus via the superior anastomotic vein, and with the transverse sinus via the inferior anastomotic vein.

Deep middle cerebral vein 
The deep middle cerebral vein (deep Sylvian vein) receives tributaries from the insula and neighboring gyri, and runs in the lower part of the lateral sulcus.

Additional images

References 

Veins of the head and neck